Frontinella huachuca is a species of sheetweb spider in the family Linyphiidae. It is found in the United States and Mexico.

Subspecies
These two subspecies belong to the species Frontinella huachuca:
 (Frontinella huachuca huachuca) Gertsch & Davis, 1946
 Frontinella huachuca benevola Gertsch & Davis, 1946

References

Linyphiidae
Articles created by Qbugbot
Spiders described in 1946